PSAT-2 is an experimental amateur radio satellite from the U.S. Naval Academy, which was developed in collaboration with the Technical University of Brno in Brno, Czech Republic. AMSAT North America's OSCAR number administrator assigned number 104 to this satellite; in the amateur radio community it is therefore also called Navy-OSCAR 104, short NO-104.

Mission
PSAT-2 was launched on June 25, 2019 with a Falcon Heavy from Kennedy Space Center, Florida, United States, as part of Mission STP-2 (Space Test Program 2) as one of 24 satellites. In August of 2019, the VHF payload failed and control of the satellite was lost. However, after nearly two years of downtime, the payload mysteriously reactivated and control was regained.

Frequencies
The following frequencies for the satellite were coordinated by the International Amateur Radio Union:

 145.825 MHz - Uplink and downlink APRS digipeater, 1200 bd (once again functional as of 2021)
 435.350 MHz - Downlink PSK31 and SSTV
 29.4815 MHz - Uplink PSK31

See also

 OSCAR

References

External links
 PSAT2 - Amateur Radio Communications Transponders. APRS
 PSAT2 SSTV camera and transponder homepage, pictures and tlm archive.

Satellites orbiting Earth
Amateur radio satellites
Spacecraft launched in 2019